Tiina Oraste (born 2 October 1962 in Abja-Paluoja) is an Estonian politician. She was a member of XI Riigikogu. Oraste was the County Governor of Järva County from 2009 until 2014.

References

Living people
1962 births
Res Publica Party politicians
Isamaa politicians
Members of the Riigikogu, 2007–2011
People from Abja-Paluoja
Tallinn University alumni